The men's 1500 m speed skating competition for the 2002 Winter Olympics was held in Salt Lake City, Utah, United States.

In reverse order of the 5000 metres, Jochem Uytdehaage first broke the world record, only to see it bettered by Derek Parra, who won the third US skating gold of the Games. He was the first Mexican-American to medal in a winter sport.

Records

Prior to this competition, the existing world and Olympic records were as follows.

The following new world and Olympic records were set during this competition.

Results

References

Men's speed skating at the 2002 Winter Olympics